The buckthorns are a genus of shrub or small tree in the family Rhamnaceae. The botanical name of the genus is Rhamnus

Buckthorn may also refer to:

Rhamnaceae, the buckthorn family
Frangula alnus, alder buckthorn
Hippophae, sea-buckthorn
Sideroxylon lanuginosum, wooly buckthorn